Elizabeth Metayer (August 12, 1911 – June 7, 1998) was an American homemaker turned politician who was a member of the Massachusetts House of Representatives from 1975–1985.

See also
 169th Massachusetts General Court

References

External links

|-

1911 births
1998 deaths
Harvard University alumni
Politicians from Braintree, Massachusetts
People from Pompano Beach, Florida
Democratic Party members of the Massachusetts House of Representatives
Women state legislators in Massachusetts
20th-century American politicians
20th-century American women politicians